During the 2000–01 English football season, Watford competed in the Football League First Division. The club was relegated from the Premier League in the previous season.

Season summary
After relegation from the Premier League, Watford stabilised in the First Division to finish 9th, five points off the play-off places. A total of 143 goals were scored in league matches involving Watford; only champions Fulham scored more goals than Watford's 76, whilst Sheffield Wednesday, Crystal Palace, Tranmere Rovers and Queens Park Rangers were the only teams to concede more than Watford's 67 league goals. Manager Graham Taylor announced his retirement at the end of the season - former Chelsea manager Gianluca Vialli was named as his replacement.

Final league table

Results summary

Results by matchday

Results
Watford's score comes first

Legend

Football League First Division

FA Cup

League Cup

Players

First-team squad
Squad at end of season

Left club during season

Reserve squad

References

Notes

Watford F.C. seasons
Watford